Between August 17 to 21, 2021, French forces under Operation Barkhane launched an operation to attack Islamic State in the Greater Sahara bases located in the Dangarous forest near In-Delimane, Mali. The battle killed the commander of ISGS, Adnan Abu Walid al-Sahrawi.

Prelude 
Two Islamic State fighters captured on July 14 reported the presence of ISGS camps in the Dangarous Forest, a notoriously wooded area that is difficult to access. On August 17, French intelligence conducted initial operations in the forest, with a Reaper drone killing two armed men on a motorcycle. One of the two killed turned out to be Adnan Abu Walid al-Sahrawi, the leader of Islamic State in the Greater Sahara, although this was not immediately identifiable. 

The second part of the operation was carried out between August 20 and August 22. About twenty men, supported by drones and helicopters, intercepted two more men on motorcycles. After a short firefight, the two men are killed. French forces then proceeded to launch airstrikes on ISGS positions inside the forest, which continued after the French soldiers retreated.

Losses and aftermath 
According to the French government, around a dozen jihadists were killed.

On September 16, 2021, French president Emmanuel Macron released a statement saying that the leader of ISGS had been "neutralized" in a strike by French forces in August. French Minister of Defence Florence Parly stated that the killing of al-Sahrawi "deals a decisive blow to the command of Daesh in the Sahel because ISGS will no doubt have difficulty replacing its emir with a figure of the same stature."

References 

Mali War
Adnan_Abu_Walid_al-Sahrawi
Adnan_Abu_Walid_al-Sahrawi
Adnan_Abu_Walid_al-Sahrawi